There are efforts to use the game of chess as a tool to aid the intellectual development of young people. Chess is significant in cognitive psychology and artificial intelligence (AI) studies, because it represents the domain in which expert performance has been most intensively studied and measured.

Research has shown that chess can have a positive impact on meta-cognitive ability and mathematical problem-solving in children, which is why several local governments, schools, and student organizations all over the world are implementing chess programs. Adult studies however show mixed results and don't conclude a positive correlation between Chess as mental training and cognitive function. 

New York-based Chess-In-The-Schools, Inc. has been active in the public school system in the city since 1986. It currently reaches more than 30,000 students annually.  America's Foundation for Chess has initiated programs in partnership with local school districts in several U.S. cities, including Seattle, San Diego, Philadelphia, and Tampa. The Chess'n Math Association promotes chess at the scholastic level in Canada. Chess for Success is a program for at-risk schools in Oregon. Since 1991, the U.S. Chess Center in Washington, D.C. teaches chess to children, especially those in the inner city, "as a means of improving their academic and social skills."

There are a number of experiments that suggest that learning and playing chess aids the mind. The Grandmaster Eugene Torre Chess Institute in the Philippines, the United States Chess Federation's chess research bibliography, and English educational consultant Tony Buzan's Brain Foundation, among others, continuously collect such experimental results. The advent of chess software that automatically record and analyze the moves of each player in each game and can tirelessly play with human players of various levels, further helped in giving new directions to experimental designs on chess as mental training.

History 

As early as 1779 Benjamin Franklin, in his article The morals of chess, advocated such a view, saying:

Alfred Binet demonstrated in the late 19th century that good chess players have superior memory and imagination. Adriaan de Groot concurred with Alfred Binet that visual memory and visual perception are important attributors and that problem-solving ability is of paramount importance. Thus, since 1972, at the collegiate level, the University of Texas at Dallas and the University of Maryland, Baltimore County both recruit chessplayer-scholars and run scholastic outreach programs in their respective communities.

References

External links 
  W. G. Chase, H. A. Simon: Perception in Chess (1973)
  USCF Chess Research Bibliography
  Hampton University Dean finds chess, business make a smart match

Artificial intelligence
Cognitive training
Mathematical chess problems